Wee Wee Hill (also known as Wewe Hill) is a hill in Highland Township, Franklin County, Indiana, in the United States.

The summit has been noted for its unusual place name. A nearby county road is named after the hill, using the spelling "Wewe".

References

Hills of Indiana
Landforms of Franklin County, Indiana